Guillaume Canet (born 10 April 1973) is a French actor, film director and screenwriter, and show jumper.

Canet began his career in theatre and television before moving to film. He starred in several films like Joyeux Noël, Love Me If You Dare and The Beach. In 2006, he turned to writing and directing with Tell No One and won a César Award for Best Director.

Early life and career
Guillaume Canet was born in Boulogne-Billancourt on 10 April 1973 to a family of horse breeders. Canet intended to become a show jumper and was a member of the junior French National Equestrian Team. However, after a fall from his horse at age 18 he turned to acting and enrolled in the Cours Florent drama school. In 1994, he appeared in the Théâtre Hébertot production of La Ville dont le prince est un enfant with Christophe Malavoy. After working in various television shows and commercials, Canet made his film debut in the short film Fils unique.

In 1997, he appeared in the thriller film Barracuda for which he won a prix d'interprétation (best actor award) at the Festival Saint-Jean-de-Luz in 1999. The same year he was nominated for a César Award for his role as Vincent Mazet in the comedy film En plein cœur. He then traveled abroad to film Danny Boyle's The Beach. After completing The Beach, Canet starred opposite Sophie Marceau in La fidélité and in Jerry Schatzberg's The Day the Ponies Come Back.

In 2002, Canet starred with Gérard Depardieu in the science fiction film Vidocq. He also directed and wrote his first feature film the same year, Mon Idole, which also starred his wife Diane Kruger. In 2003, he appeared opposite Marion Cotillard in Yann Samuell's Love Me If You Dare which became a sleeper hit. Canet next appeared in the international production Joyeux Noël which tells the story of the World War I Christmas cease fire. The film—which also featured Kruger—was nominated for an Academy Award for Best Foreign Language Film.

Canet released his second feature film in 2006, Tell No One, an adaptation of Harlan Coben's novel of the same name. Tell No One was the ninth top grossing French film of 2006 and went on to win four César awards, including a César Award for Best Director for Canet.

His film  Blood Ties was selected to be screened Out of Competition at the 2013 Cannes Film Festival.

Personal life
In 1999, he started a relationship with German-born model and actress Diane Kruger. They were married on 1 September 2001. In January 2006, Canet and Kruger filed for divorce. Kruger later said that the marriage was not successful because their careers had kept them occupied in different parts of the world. After his divorce, Canet started a relationship with model Carla Bruni that was widely reported by the French media, and later he was in a relationship with actress Élodie Navarre.

Canet has been in a relationship with actress Marion Cotillard since October 2007. The two had known each other since 1997, and years later starred together in the 2003 film Love Me If You Dare. They later co-starred in the 2009 film The Last Flight. The couple has attracted considerable attention from the French media, but for a long time they did not discuss their relationship and did not appear together on a red carpet event until the Cannes Film Festival in 2009. The couple has a son together, Marcel, born on 19 May 2011. The couple are not married. Though since 2010 Cotillard has been spotted wearing a diamond solitaire on her left hand – a present from Canet – they are not engaged either. In 2014, Cotillard denied being married to Canet, instead referring to him as "my boyfriend" in interviews. The couple welcomed their second child, a girl named Louise in 2017.

In July 2012, paparazzo Jean-Claude Elfassi accused Canet of violence during an altercation as Canet and Cotillard arrived home from the hospital maternity ward with their newborn son in May 2011. According to the photographer, Canet left his house with an iron bar and threatened him before police stepped in. Elfassi's son filmed the actor with his cell phone and while Canet made sure the footage was erased from the web, photos were published on French magazine Entrevue. Elfassi and his son attempted to sue the actor for "violence" and "theft" and their case was not only dismissed, but Elfassi faces charges for "false accusation" and could spend nine months in jail.

Canet is an accomplished show jumper and between 2012 and 2017 participated in 623 competitions, winning 33 of them and taking nearly €67,000 in prize money. He was notably placed in competitions at international shows in Paris, La Baule and Chantilly Jumping.

Filmography

As actor
 1995 : Fils unique, directed by Philippe Landoulsi (short-film)
 1997 : Barracuda, directed by Philippe Haïm, prix d'interprétation au Festival de Saint-Jean-de-Luz
 1998 : Sentimental Education, directed by C. S. Leigh
 1998 : Ceux qui m'aiment prendront le train, directed by Patrice Chéreau
 1998 : En plein cœur, directed by Pierre Jolivet, adapted from the novel by Georges Simenon, En cas de malheur
 1999 : Trait d'union, directed by Bruno García (short-film)
 1999 : Je règle mon pas sur le pas de mon père, directed by Rémi Waterhouse
 2000 : J'peux pas dormir..., directed by Guillaume Canet (short-film)
 2000 : The Beach (La Plage), directed by Danny Boyle
 2000 : Fidelity (La Fidélité), directed by Andrzej Żuławski
 2000 : The Day the Ponies Come Back, directed by Jerry Schatzberg
 2001 : , directed by Antoine de Caunes
 2001 : Vidocq, directed by Pitof
 2002 : Le Frère du guerrier, directed by Pierre Jolivet
 2002 : Mille millièmes, directed by Rémi Waterhouse
 2002 : Mon Idole, directed by Guillaume Canet
 2003 : Love Me If You Dare (Jeux d'enfants), directed by Yann Samuell
 2003 : Les Clefs de bagnole, directed by Laurent Baffie (only a cameo, as himself)
 2004 : Narco, directed by Tristan Aurouet and Gilles Lellouche
 2005 : Joyeux Noël, directed by Christian Carion
 2005 : Hell (L'Enfer), directed by Danis Tanovic
 2005 : Un ticket pour l'espace, directed by Éric Lartigau
 2006 : Tell No One (Ne le dis à personne), directed by Guillaume Canet
 2006 : Cars (French voice of Flash McQueen)
 2007 : Ensemble, c'est tout, directed by Claude Berri
 2007 : Darling, directed by Christine Carrière
 2007 : La clef, directed by Guillaume Nicloux
 2008 : Rivals, directed by Jacques Maillot
 2008 : Voyage d'affaires, directed by Sean Ellis
 2009 : Espion(s), directed by Nicolas Saada
 2009 : L'affaire Farewell, directed by Christian Carion
 2009 : The Last Flight, directed by Karim Dridi
 2010 : Last Night, directed by Massy Tadjedin
 2011 : Une vie meilleure, directed by Cédric Kahn
 2011 : La nouvelle guerre des boutons, L'instituteur
 2012 : The Players, Thibault
 2013 : Jappeloup as Pierre Durand, Jr.
 2013 : Turning Tide as Frank Drevil
 2014 : In the Name of My Daughter as Maurice Agnelet
 2014 : Next Time I'll Aim for the Heart as Franck
 2015 : The Program as Michele Ferrari
 2015 : Minions as Herb Overkill 
 2016 : Arctic Heart as Quignard
 2016 : Cézanne and I as Émile Zola 
 2016 : The Siege of Jadotville as Rene Faulques
 2017 : Mon garçon as Julien
 2017 : Rock'n Roll as Guillaume Canet
 2018 : Sink or Swim
 2018 : Non-Fiction
 2019 : La Belle Époque
 2019 : In the Name of the Land
 2021 : Lui
 2023 : Asterix & Obelix: The Middle Kingdom, directed by Guillaume Canet

As director

Frequent casting

References

External links

 Official site
 

1973 births
Living people
Best Director César Award winners
People from Boulogne-Billancourt
French male film actors
French male television actors
French film directors
20th-century French male actors
21st-century French male actors
Cours Florent alumni
French-language film directors
English-language film directors
French male screenwriters
20th-century French screenwriters
21st-century French screenwriters
French film producers
French show jumping riders